Marwin Hitz (born 18 September 1987) is a Swiss professional footballer who plays as a goalkeeper for Swiss Super League club Basel and the Switzerland national team.

Career

Early career
Born in St. Gallen, Hitz was signed by his hometown club when he was nine years old. He represented the club at youth level, and regularly played for the reserve team from 2005 to 2007. The closest he got to the first team was as a unused substitute in 2005 and 2006. In the 2007–08 season, he went on loan to Yverdon-Sport, and then to Winterthur, ending the season as first-choice goalkeeper at the latter club.

Wolfsburg
On 2 September 2008, Hitz signed for Bundesliga club Wolfsburg. He mainly played for the reserve team, but he was a unused substitute for two matches in early 2009. He made his debut for the first team in a Europa League match against Villarreal, and made his Bundesliga debut in a match against Schalke 04. While at Wolfsburg, he initially deputised for André Lenz and then mid-season signing Diego Benaglio, who he failed to displace. In fact, the six appearances he made during the 2010–11 season (his personal best at the club), was due to Benaglio tearing his abductor muscle and later, not being in the squad.

Augsburg
Hitz joined Augsburg in the summer of 2013. On 29 March 2014, Mainz 05's Eric Maxim Choupo-Moting had a shot that was deflected by Matthias Ostrzolek, which Hitz tipped away onto the post. Ostrzolek, under pressure from Nicolai Müller, tried to clear the rebound, but it caught Hitz in the face, resulting in an own goal.

On 21 February 2015, Hitz scored a stoppage-time equaliser for Augsburg in a league match against Bayer Leverkusen in a 2–2 draw. On 5 December, Hitz intentionally sabotaged the ground near the penalty spot after a penalty was awarded to 1. FC Köln in their match against Augsburg. Anthony Modeste missed the penalty, and Augsburg went on to win the match 1–0. Hitz later apologised for his actions. Hitz was billed €122.92 by 1. FC Köln for the damage he caused to the pitch, which he agreed to pay.

Borussia Dortmund
On 18 May 2018, Hitz signed a three-year contract with Borussia Dortmund, where he deputised for Roman Bürki. He made two appearances in the league, with his debut on 10 November in a 3–2 win over Bayern Munich, and then late on in the season in a 3–2 win over Fortuna Düsseldorf. On 17 August, the opening day of the season, Hitz started the match against his former club Augsburg. Although he conceded in the first minute to Florian Niederlechner's tap-in, Dortmund went on to win 5–1. Hitz came on for the last twenty minutes after Bürki was injured in a 1–0 win over Borussia Mönchengladbach. He kept his place, as Bürki missed the match due to illness, in a 0–0 draw with Schalke 04, and again, for a 3–0 win over Wolfsburg.

Hitz made his first appearance of the 2020–21 season, in a 4–0 win over Freiburg, after Bürki was ruled out with an infection. He played in the next match, a 1–0 win over Hoffenheim, before returning to the bench. On 20 October, during Dortmund's Champions League opener against Lazio, Hitz inadvertently scored an own goal when Luiz Felipe's header was deflected in by the Austrian. From January to May 2021, Hitz had his longest spell as the first-choice goalkeeper, when Bürki had a shoulder injury. His season ended during a 3–2 win against RB Leipzig, after suffering a knee injury.

Basel 
On 20 May 2022, Hitz returned to Switzerland and signed a three year contract with Basel under head coach Alexander Frei. After playing in three test games Hitz played his domestic league debut for his new club in the away game in the Schützenwiese on 16 July 2022 as Basel drew 1–1 with Winterthur.

International career
On 10 June 2015, Hitz won his first cap for Switzerland in a 3–0 friendly win over Liechtenstein at Stockhorn Arena in Thun.

Hitz was part of the squad for UEFA Euro 2016, but did not play in any matches for Switzerland at the tournament. Ultimately, his side were eliminated in the second round after losing 5–4 on penalties to Poland.

Personal life
Hitz has three children with his wife Patricia.

Career statistics

Club

Honours
Borussia Dortmund
 DFB-Pokal: 2020–21
 DFL-Supercup: 2019

References

External links
 
 

1987 births
Living people
Sportspeople from St. Gallen (city)
Swiss men's footballers
Yverdon-Sport FC players
FC Winterthur players
VfL Wolfsburg players
VfL Wolfsburg II players
FC Augsburg players
Borussia Dortmund players
FC Basel players
Bundesliga players
Association football goalkeepers
Swiss expatriate footballers
Expatriate footballers in Germany
Swiss expatriate sportspeople in Germany
Switzerland under-21 international footballers
Switzerland international footballers
UEFA Euro 2016 players